The Chief of the Joint Command of the Peruvian Armed Forces is the professional head of the Peruvian Armed Forces. He is responsible for the administration and the operational control of the Peruvian military.

List of chiefs

President of the Joint Command

Chief of the Joint Command

References

Peruvian military leaders
Peru